Socarides is a surname. People with the surname include:
Charles Socarides (January 24, 1922 - December 25, 2005), American psychiatrist, psychoanalyst, physician, educator, and author
Richard Socarides (born 1954), American political strategist and commentator and attorney, son of Charles